Szopa  is a village in the administrative district of Gmina Sierakowice, within Kartuzy County, Pomeranian Voivodeship, in northern Poland. There is a small school in Szopa. Students learn three languages - English, German and Kashubian.

For details of the history of the region, see History of Pomerania.

The village has a population of 193.

References

Szopa